Matt Lockett (born June 8, 1974) is an American politician from Kentucky. He is a member of the Republican Party and currently represents the 39th District in the State House. It is believed that he is the first Republican to ever hold this seat in the legislature.

Before being elected to office, Lockett served as chair of the Jessamine County Republican Party and worked as a financial services professional. He had previously tried to run for the 39th district in 2012, losing in the general election to Democrat Bob Dameron.

References 

Living people
Republican Party members of the Kentucky House of Representatives
People from Paducah, Kentucky
People from Nicholasville, Kentucky
Murray State University alumni
Southern Baptist Theological Seminary alumni
21st-century American politicians
1974 births